Kevin Francisco Maitán Hernández (born February 12, 2000) is a Venezuelan professional baseball shortstop for the Los Angeles Angels organization.

Professional career

Atlanta Braves
Maitán was considered the top international prospect for the 2016 class. Though a natural shortstop, Maitán has most often been projected as a third baseman in professional baseball. He has been called the best international free agent since Miguel Sanó in 2009 and has been compared to Miguel Cabrera and Chipper Jones. He signed with the Atlanta Braves on July 2, receiving a $4.25 million signing bonus. Maitán arrived in the United States in September to begin his professional career at the instructional league. He made his debut with the Rookie-level Gulf Coast League Braves on July 3, 2017, and after batting .314 with a .751 OPS in nine games, he was promoted to the Rookie Advanced Danville Braves, where he finished 2017, posting a .220 average with two home runs and 15 RBIs.

On October 2, 2017, Braves general manager John Coppolella and international scouting director Gordon Blakely resigned after an MLB investigation into their activities discovered several rules violations regarding international signings. On November 21, MLB ordered that Maitan and several other players were released from their contracts and declared to be free agents.

Los Angeles Angels
Maitán signed with the Los Angeles Angels, receiving a $2.2 million signing bonus. He played for the Orem Owlz of the Advanced Rookie-level Pioneer League in 2018. In 2019, he was promoted to the Class-A level Burlington Bees. He played 123 games and finished with a slash line of .214/.278/.323.

References

External links

2000 births
Baseball shortstops
Danville Braves players
Gulf Coast Braves players
Living people
Venezuelan expatriate baseball players in the United States
Orem Owlz players
People from Puerto Cabello